Marionette is the debut extended play (EP) by South Korean girl group Stellar. It was released on February 12, 2014, with the lead single "Marionette" used to promote the EP. "Marionette" became their best-selling single, peaking at number 35 and 34 on the Gaon and Billboard K-Pop Hot 100 charts, respectively.

Background and release
On middle-January, 2014 The Entertainment Pascal announced to Stellar have a debut mini album. On February 11, 2014 post the first teaser for album.

On February 12, 2014, Stellar released the video for their debut album's title song, "Marionette".

Track listing

Notes
  signifies a remixer

References

2014 EPs
K-pop EPs
Stellar (South Korean band) albums